Michel Batista Martínez (born April 20, 1984 in Camagüey) is a Cuban freestyle wrestler and Mixed Martial Artist. He competed in the Ultimate Fighting Championship (UFC) in the heavyweight division and  currently competes in M-1 Global.

Wrestling 
Batista competed for Cuba men's heavyweight wrestling category. He won a gold medal for his division at the 2007 Pan American Games in Rio de Janeiro, Brazil, defeating Venezuela's Luis Vivénes.

Batista represented Cuba at the 2008 Summer Olympics in Beijing, where he competed for the men's 96 kg class. He received an automatic free pass from the preliminary round of sixteen after U.S. wrestler Daniel Cormier had been withdrawn from the competition due to complications related to excessive weight cutting. He lost the quarterfinal match to Kazakhstan's Taimuraz Tigiyev, who was able to score three points in two straight periods, leaving Batista without a single point. Because his opponent advanced further into the final match, Batista offered another shot for the bronze medal by defeating his former opponent Vivenes in the repechage round. He progressed to the bronze medal match, but narrowly lost by a fall to Georgia's Giorgi Gogshelidze.

Mixed martial arts career

Early career
Batista amassed a record of 4-0 prior join the TUF 28.

The Ultimate Fighter

In August 2018, it was announced that Batista was one of the fighters featured on The Ultimate Fighter 28, competing in the heavyweight division.

In the quarterfinals, Batista defeated Josh Parisian via technical knockout in the second round, allowing him to move on to the next stage of the competition. In the semifinals, Batista faced Justin Frazier. He lost the fight via technical knockout in round one.

Ultimate Fighting Championship
Batista faced Maurice Greene on November 30 at The Ultimate Fighter: Heavy Hitters Finale. He lost fight via a triangle choke in round one.

Mixed martial arts record

|-
|Loss
|align=center|4–2 (1)
|Yuriy Fedorov
|Submission (guillotine choke)
|M-1 Challenge 105
|
|align=center|1
|align=center|4:06
|Nur-Sultan, Kazakhstan
|
|-
|Loss
|align=center|4–1 (1)
|Maurice Greene
|Submission (triangle choke)
|The Ultimate Fighter: Heavy Hitters Finale 
|
|align=center|1
|align=center|2:14
|Las Vegas, Nevada, United States
|
|-
|Win
|align=center|4–0 (1)
|Edison Lopes
|Decision (unanimous)
|Titan FC 47: Yusuff vs. Gomez
|
|align=center|3
|align=center|5:00
|Fort Lauderdale, Florida, United States
|
|-
|Win
|align=center|3–0 (1)
|Drew Stewart
|Decision (unanimous)
|Fight Time 35
|
|align=center|3
|align=center|5:00
|Miami, Florida, United States
|
|-
|NC
|align=center|2–0 (1)
|Oscar Delgado
|NC (accidental eye poke)
|Fight Time 34
|
|align=center|1
|align=center|N/A
|Fort Lauderdale, Florida, United States
|
|-
|Win
|align=center|2–0
|Andreas Danapas
|TKO (punches)
|Fight Time 30
|
|align=center|2
|align=center|4:32
|Fort Lauderdale, Florida, United States
|
|-
|Win
|align=center|1–0
|Russell Johnson
|KO (punch)
|World Fighting Championship 46
|
|align=center|1
|align=center|1:40
|Baton Rouge, Louisiana, United States
|

Mixed martial arts exhibition record

|-
|Loss
|align=center|1–1
|Justin Frazier
|TKO (punches)
|The Ultimate Fighter 28
| (airdate)
|align=center|1
|align=center|4:24
|Las Vegas, Nevada, United States
|
|-
|Win
|align=center|1–0
|Josh Parisian
|TKO (punches)
|The Ultimate Fighter 28
| (airdate)
|align=center|2
|align=center|2:50
|Las Vegas, Nevada, United States
|

References

External links
 
NBC 2008 Olympics profile

1984 births
Living people
Olympic wrestlers of Cuba
Wrestlers at the 2007 Pan American Games
Wrestlers at the 2011 Pan American Games
Wrestlers at the 2008 Summer Olympics
Sportspeople from Camagüey
Pan American Games gold medalists for Cuba
Cuban male sport wrestlers
Pan American Games medalists in wrestling
Central American and Caribbean Games gold medalists for Cuba
Competitors at the 2006 Central American and Caribbean Games
Ultimate Fighting Championship male fighters
Central American and Caribbean Games medalists in wrestling
Medalists at the 2007 Pan American Games
Olympic medalists in wrestling
Olympic bronze medalists for Cuba